Jackson Kênio Santos Laurentino (born 24 April 1999), commonly known as Jackson, is a Brazilian footballer who currently plays as a midfielder for Egnatia Rrogozhinë.

Career statistics

Club

Notes

References

1999 births
Living people
Brazilian footballers
Brazilian expatriate footballers
Association football forwards
ABC Futebol Clube players
América Futebol Clube (MG) players
SK Vorwärts Steyr players
Campeonato Brasileiro Série B players
2. Liga (Austria) players
Expatriate footballers in Austria
Brazilian expatriate sportspeople in Austria